Partry is a village and a civil parish formerly called Ballyovey in County Mayo, Ireland. It is located at the junction of the N84 and R330 roads between the towns of Ballinrobe and Castlebar, and between Lough Carra and Lough Mask. The lakes Cloon Lough and Lough Nacorralea are located near Partry.

While formerly known as Ballyovey, the contemporary name, Partry, derives from the word "Partraige", which is the name of the tribe that lived in the area in ancient times.

In 2004, Partry Athletic Football Club was formed by members of the local community. It won Division 2 of the Mayo league the season after its formation.

A priest-hunter named Seán na Sagart was killed in Partry.

Notable people
Lacky Ó Máille (fl. 18th century),  was an Irish friar and poet.

See also
 List of towns and villages in Ireland

References

External links
 Partry at Mayo Ireland website
 Partry House at Museums of Mayo
 Partry House website

Civil parishes of County Mayo
Towns and villages in County Mayo